Jesse Anne Villanueva Shugg (born May 2, 1992) is a footballer who plays as a forward for Blue Devils FC in League1 Ontario. Born in Canada, she represents the Philippines national team.

Early life
She played youth soccer with the Burlington Youth SC. In 2009, she won the Golden Boot award at the Canadian youth national championship.

College career
In 2010, she committed to attend Florida Atlantic University, where she would play for the women's soccer team. She scored her first goal on September 10, 2010 against the North Dakota State Bison. In her sophomore season, she served as team captain. She led FAU in goals and points during both her seasons.

In 2012, she transferred to the University of Miami to play for the women's soccer team. She scored her first goal on August 17, 2012 against the Florida Gators.

Club career
In 2011, she played with the Toronto Lady Lynx in the USL W-League.

In 2012, she played with Hamilton FC Rage and then played with them again in 2014, after they relocated and became K-W United FC.

In 2016, Shugg was signed to play for UMF Tindastóll of the Icelandic second-tier 1. deild kvenna. On July 20, she scored a hat trick against Fjarðab/Höttur/Leiknir. With Tindastóll, she scored 11 goals in 7 games.

In November 2016, Shugg was signed with Fylkir of the Úrvalsdeild kvenna for the 2017 season.

In 2022, she played with Blue Devils FC in League1 Ontario.

International career
In 2009, Shugg attended a camp with the Canadian U-20 national team.

In 2012, she attended a camp in California, where the national team coach was looking at players of Filipino descent in North America, which was immediately followed by the 2012 LA Vikings Cup tournament against American club teams, where the Phillipines won the tournament and she scored five goals in an 8-1 win against club side Leon.

She made her official international debut on May 21, 2013 at the 2014 AFC Women's Asian Cup qualifiers against Iran, where she scored two goals in a 6-0 victory. She later represented the team at the 2013 South East Asian Games, 2015 AFF Women's Championship, and 2018 AFC Women's Asian Cup

International goals
Scores and results list the Philippines' goal tally first.

Coaching career
Shugg worked with the PBA Sailfish women's soccer team as an assistant coach in 2014.

References

External links
 
 

1992 births
Living people
Citizens of the Philippines through descent
Filipino women's footballers
Women's association football forwards
Florida Atlantic Owls women's soccer players
Miami Hurricanes women's soccer players
Ungmennafélagið Tindastóll women's football players
Philippines women's international footballers
Filipino expatriate footballers
Filipino expatriate sportspeople in the United States
Expatriate women's soccer players in the United States
Filipino expatriate sportspeople in Iceland
Expatriate women's footballers in Iceland
Sportspeople from Burlington, Ontario
Soccer people from Ontario
Canadian women's soccer players
Canadian expatriate women's soccer players
Canadian expatriate sportspeople in the United States
Canadian expatriate sportspeople in Iceland
Canadian expatriates in the United States
Canadian sportspeople of Filipino descent
Blue Devils FC (women) players
Burlington SC (League1 Ontario) players
Toronto Lady Lynx players
USL W-League (1995–2015) players
K-W United FC players
Palm Beach Atlantic Sailfish women's soccer coaches